Ciceu-Mihăiești is a commune in Bistrița-Năsăud County, Transylvania, Romania. It is composed of three villages: Ciceu-Corabia, Ciceu-Mihăiești and Lelești. These were part of Petru Rareș Commune until 2005, when they were split off.

References

Communes in Bistrița-Năsăud County
Localities in Transylvania